Fort Mercer was an earthen fort on the Delaware River on its New Jersey shore constructed by the Continental Army during the American Revolutionary War. Built by Polish engineer Thaddeus Kosciuszko under the command of George Washington, Fort Mercer was built in 1777 to block the approach to Philadelphia, Pennsylvania in concert with Fort Mifflin on the Pennsylvania side.

Fort Mercer was located in an area called Red Bank in what is now the borough of National Park in Gloucester County, New Jersey. The fort was named in honor of Brigadier General Hugh Mercer who died earlier that year at the Battle of Princeton. The fort's site is now part of Red Bank Battlefield Historical Park, which includes a monument and museum. Several cannons attributed to British warships lost supporting the attack on the fort, and others found buried at the fort itself, are in the park.

Background

Fort Mercer was built and Fort Mifflin rebuilt and garrisoned to protect a line of chevaux de frise obstacles across the Delaware River. Fort Billingsport was built downriver to protect another line of these obstacles. Fort Mercer had earthen walls with a surrounding ditch, topped with a log palisade. A separate outer redoubt was located north of the fort, but this was not garrisoned. The fort could accommodate a garrison of 1,500 men, but only 600 were available, mostly Rhode Island troops of the Continental Army commanded by Colonel Christopher Greene, also a Rhode Islander. French officer Thomas Duplessis made the fort more defensible by the small garrison by having a wall built inside the river side of the fort.

On October 22, 1777, in the Battle of Red Bank, an attack by 900 Hessian troops under British Major General William Howe, then occupying Philadelphia, was repelled by Fort Mifflin's defenders with heavy losses on the Hessian side, over 500 casualties including the death of their commander, Colonel Carl Emil Kurt von Donop. The defenders suffered only 40 casualties. Galleys of the Continental and Pennsylvania Navies under Commodore John Hazelwood provided supporting fire. Six British warships under the command of Admiral Francis Reynolds were also involved, two of which ran aground while avoiding the chevaux de frise and were soon destroyed by fire during the battle. Fort Mifflin and the Pennsylvania Navy engaged the stranded ships the next morning, with cannons and fire rafts, respectively.  of 64 guns caught fire and within an hour the fire reached the magazine and the ship exploded, though the loss was attributed to accidental ignition by the British. One account states a British Marine accidentally fired his musket into a hammock, with the fire resulting from subsequent smoldering.  was also lost. After the later loss of Fort Mifflin, Fort Mercer was abandoned when Lord Charles Cornwallis landed 2,000 British troops nearby on November 18, 1777. As British artillery breached the walls, the defenders of Fort Mercer blew up their magazine before abandoning the fort.

The British abandoned Fort Mercer as they evacuated Philadelphia on June 18, 1778. The Patriots re-occupied the site and rebuilt the fort, manning it until 1781 when the fighting moved to Yorktown, Virginia.

Gallery

See also

 National Register of Historic Places listings in Gloucester County, New Jersey
Fort Mifflin
Fort Billingsport
Seacoast defense in the United States
List of coastal fortifications of the United States

References

External links
 Forts and Fortifications at PhiladelphiaEncyclopedia.org

New Jersey in the American Revolution
1777 establishments in New Jersey
American Revolution on the National Register of Historic Places
Mercer
Buildings and structures in Gloucester County, New Jersey
Mercer
National Park, New Jersey
National Register of Historic Places in Gloucester County, New Jersey
Mercer
Mercer